Asthelys antarctica is a species of extremely small deep water sea snail, a marine gastropod mollusk in the family Seguenziidae.

Description
The shell attains a height of 5.8 mm.

Distribution
This species occurs in Antarctic waters off the South Shetland Islands at a depth of about 3700 m.

References

 Malacolog: Asthelys antarctica

External links
 To Antarctic Invertebrates
 To Encyclopedia of Life
 To USNM Invertebrate Zoology Mollusca Collection
 To World Register of Marine Species

antarctica
Gastropods described in 1988